Arkansas Tech University (ATU) is a public university in Russellville, Arkansas. The university offers programs at both baccalaureate and graduate levels in a range of fields. The Arkansas Tech University–Ozark Campus, a two-year satellite campus in the town of Ozark, primarily focuses on associate and certificate education.

History

Early history (1909–76)

The Second District Agricultural School was created by Act 100 of 1909 of the Arkansas General Assembly. It was decided on February 10, 1910, to found the school in Russellville. Construction of the school's Main Building began on April 10, 1910, with contracts for additional buildings let in June 1910.  On October 26, 1910, the first classes were held in Russellville. The original purpose of the school was to offer a secondary (or high school) education in agricultural and technical subjects. Later on, the school took on the first two years of college instruction, and the school's name was changed to Arkansas Polytechnic College by the General Assembly in 1925 to reflect this change in purpose. The school became a two-year junior college in 1927 and, at the end of the 1929-1930 academic year, stopped offering high school classes.

Recent history (1976–present)
The school took on its current name of Arkansas Tech University on July 9, 1976.

In the fall of 2003, Arkansas Tech University announced it intended to take over the state vocational school, Arkansas Valley Technical Institute, in Ozark, the seat of Franklin County. As of July 1, 2004, the Ozark campus has acted as a satellite campus of Arkansas Tech and has begun offering coursework leading toward an Associate of Applied Science degree in various subjects.

From 1997 to 2015, enrollment at Arkansas Tech increased by 183 percent. The fall of 2015 marked the 17th consecutive year that Arkansas Tech established a new institutional record for largest enrollment at 12,054 students, making ATU the 3rd largest institution of higher learning in the state.

Arkansas Tech has invested $180 million in upgrades to its infrastructure since 1995 and the university has added more than 40 new academic programs of study under the leadership of Robert C. Brown, who has served as president of Arkansas Tech since 1993. In April 2014, Dr. Robin E. Bowen was selected by the university trustees selected to succeed Brown. When she took office on 1 July 2014, she became the first woman to lead a four-year, public Arkansas university.

Facilities on National Register of Historic Places

Several Tech buildings are listed on the National Register of Historic Places.
Caraway Hall — Residence Hall, renovated in 2005.
Old Art Building — Retired academic building. Now known as Browning Hall, renovated in 2013 to house administrative offices.
Hughes Hall — Residence Hall, renovated in 2010.
Techionery — Academic building, mainly used as a theatre shop and performance space by the ATU Theatre Department.
Williamson Hall — Academic building, renovated in 2003 to include kitchen facilities.
Wilson Hall — Residence Hall.

Academics

College of Applied Sciences
Agriculture
Computer and Information Science
Electrical Engineering
Emergency Management
Mechanical Engineering
Parks, Recreation and Hospitality Administration

College of Arts & Humanities
Art
Behavioral Sciences
English
Foreign Language
History & Political Science
Music
Communication and Media Studies

College of Business
Accounting
Management and Marketing
Business Data Analytics 
Economics and Finance
Business Education

College of Natural & Health Sciences
Biological Sciences
Mathematics
Nursing
Physical Sciences

College of Education
Curriculum and Instruction
Health and Physical Education
Student Affairs Administration

College of Professional Studies and Community Outreach
Early Childhood Education
General Studies
Professional Studies

Academic Centers
Academic Advising Center
Center for Teaching and Learning
Crabaugh Communication Programs
Energy Center
Museum
Ross Pendergraft Library and Technology Center
Student Support Services

Student life

Residential halls

Baswell Hall
Brown Hall (Male only)
Caraway Hall (Sorority only)
Hughes Hall
Jones Hall
M Street Hall
Nutt Hall

Paine Hall
Stadium Suites
Tucker Hall
Turner Hall (Female only)
University Commons Apartments
Vista Place Apartments
Wilson Hall

Greek system

Fraternities
 
Alpha Tau Omega
Alpha Phi Alpha
Kappa Alpha Order
Kappa Sigma

Pi Kappa Alpha
Sigma Pi
Sigma Phi Epsilon
Phi Lambda Chi
Omega Psi Phi
Alpha Sigma Phi

Sororities
Alpha Sigma Tau
Delta Zeta
Zeta Tau Alpha
Zeta Phi Beta
Phi Mu

Service / Co-ed
Alpha Phi Omega

 Music Greek Fraternities and Sororities
Sigma Alpha Iota
Tau Beta Sigma
Phi Mu Alpha Sinfonia

Athletics

Arkansas Tech participates in NCAA Division II athletics as a charter member of the Great American Conference. Tech was a member of the Gulf South Conference from 1995 to 2011. Previously, Tech was a member of the Arkansas Intercollegiate Conference in the National Association of Intercollegiate Athletics. The university fields four men's and six women's varsity sports, as well as a club sports program:

Men's sports
Baseball
Basketball
Football
Golf

Women's sports
Basketball
Cross Country
Golf
Softball
Tennis
Volleyball

Club / Recreation sports
Cycling
Fishing
Paddlers
Soccer

Facilities

Arkansas Tech University has dual nicknames: men's athletic teams are called the Wonder Boys, while the women's teams are called the Golden Suns.

Chartwells Women's Sports Complex (tennis, softball)
Hull Building (Athletic Training, Athletic Performance Development, intramurals)
Tech Field (baseball, capacity 600)
Thone Stadium at Buerkle Field (football, capacity 6,500)
Tucker Coliseum (basketball/volleyball, capacity 3,500)

Nicknames
On November 15, 1919, John Tucker, a 17-year-old freshman from Russellville, scored two touchdowns and kicks two extra points to lead the Second District Agricultural School Aggies to a 14–0 upset win over Jonesboro. In newspaper accounts following the game, Tucker and his teammates were referred to as "Wonder Boys," and the nickname remains to this day. Tucker was labeled as "The Original Wonder Boy" and was associated with the school for the rest of his life. He went on to play on the University of Alabama's Rose Bowl team in 1931 and served Arkansas Tech in a variety of roles – including coach, athletic director and chemistry professor – between 1925 and 1972. Two buildings on the Tech campus – Tucker Coliseum and Tucker Hall – are named in his honor.

Tired of being referred to as the Wonder Girls or Wonderettes, the female athletes of Arkansas Tech held a contest in the spring of 1975 to determine what their new mascot would be. Several names were nominated, but in the end, the athletes selected Golden Suns as their new nickname.

Notable alumni
Denny Altes (Bachelor of Business Administration), clergyman and Republican former member of the Arkansas House of Representatives from District 63; former member of the Arkansas State Senate and former Senate Minority Leader
Leon L. "Doc" Bryan (Class of 1942), U.S. Navy veteran, Arkansas Hall of Distinction member, Democratic member of the Arkansas House of Representatives (1965 - 1995), Speaker of the Arkansas House of Representatives (1993 - 1995), honored by naming the Doc Bryan Student Services Center by the ATU Board of Trustees in 1998.
John Burris, member of the Arkansas House of Representatives from Boone County
Robert E. Dale (bachelor's degree in mathematics), Republican member of the Arkansas House of Representatives from District 68 in Pope and Van Buren counties; former member of the Dover School Board in Dover
Trevor Drown (Class of 2001), Republican member of the Arkansas House of Representatives for Pope and Van Buren counties since 2015; Libertarian Party U.S. Senate nominee in 2010
Jane English (Class of 1981, economics/finance), Republican member of the Arkansas State Senate from District 34 in Pulaski County
Jon Eubanks (B.S. in accounting, 1990), Republican member of the Arkansas House of Representatives from Logan County
Elizabeth Gracen (Attended), Former Miss America in 1982. She won the contest when she was a junior accounting major at Arkansas Tech. 
Michael Lamoureux, Republican; former Arkansas State Representative from District 68 (Pope County) 2005-2009; former Arkansas State Senator from District 4, 2009–2013; former Arkansas State Senator from District 16 (Newton and Pope counties and parts of Boone, Carroll and Van Buren counties) 2013-2014; chief of staff to the governor of Arkansas 2015–present
Andrea Lea (B.S. in emergency administration and management), Republican member of the Arkansas House of Representatives from Russellville since 2009; candidate for state auditor in 2014
Kelley Linck (B.S. in business administration, 1986), Republican member of the Arkansas House of Representatives from Marion County since 2011
Tanner Marsh, Montreal Alouettes quarterback of the Canadian Football League.
Rebecca Petty (B.S. in criminal justice, 2013), Republican member of the Arkansas House of Representatives for Benton County since 2015; advocate of child crime victims, resident of Rogers, Arkansas
Marcus Richmond (B.S. in physical education), Republican member of the Arkansas House of Representatives from multi-county District 21 in western Arkansas
Tray Scott (Class of 2008) Defensive Line Coach at the University of Georgia 
Greg Standridge (B.S. in business, 1987), Republican member of the Arkansas State Senate for Pope, Newton, Boone, Carroll and Van Buren counties since 2015; insurance agent in Russellville
Boyd Anderson Tackett, Democratic U.S. representative from Arkansas's 4th congressional district, 1949 to 1953
Steve Womack, Republican U.S. representative from Arkansas's 3rd congressional district, 2010–Present
Eliah Drinkwitz, (B.A. social studies education, 2004), Head Football Coach, University of Missouri.

References

External links

Arkansas Tech Athletics website

 
Public universities and colleges in Arkansas
Technological universities in the United States
Education in Pope County, Arkansas
Russellville, Arkansas
1909 establishments in Arkansas
Educational institutions established in 1909